The Brisbane Marathon was first run in 1992 and is Brisbane's only marathon distance running event.  Other races in the marathon festival include a half marathon, a 10 km run, a 5 km run/walk and a children's 2 km 'mini marathon'.

The marathon course is IAAF-AIMS certified and accepted as a Boston Marathon qualifier.

The 2012 race saw more than 5,000 participants from 18 countries race along inner city streets.

There was no marathon in 2020. Entrants got automatic entry deferral to 2021 besides running a virtual race for no charge.

Results
* = Gender Course Record

Marathon Winners

Half Marathon Winners

See also

Bridge to Brisbane
List of marathon races in Oceania
Sport in Brisbane

References

External links

Marathons in Australia
Recurring sporting events established in 1992
1992 establishments in Australia
Sports competitions in Brisbane
Annual sporting events in Australia
Athletics in Queensland
August sporting events